The 1924 Tour de France was the 18th edition of Tour de France, one of cycling's Grand Tours. The Tour began in Paris with a flat stage on 22 June, and Stage 8 occurred on 6 July with a flat stage to Toulon. The race finished in Paris on 20 July.

Stage 1
22 June 1924 — Paris to Le Havre,

Stage 2
24 June 1924 — Le Havre to Cherbourg-en-Cotentin,

Stage 3
26 June 1924 — Cherbourg-en-Cotentin to Brest,

Stage 4
28 June 1924 — Brest to Les Sables-d'Olonne,

Stage 5
30 June 1924 — Les Sables-d'Olonne to Bayonne,

Stage 6
2 July 1924 — Bayonne to Luchon,

Stage 7
4 July 1924 — Luchon to Perpignan,

Stage 8
6 July 1924 — Perpignan to Toulon,

References

1924 Tour de France
Tour de France stages